Francis Ralph "Butch" Stahan (October 29, 1916 – May 25, 1995) was a Canadian professional ice hockey defenceman who played nine games in the National Hockey League for the Montreal Canadiens. He was born in Minnedosa, Manitoba. Name Francis confirmed by his son.

External links

Butch Stahan's profile at Hockey-Reference.com

1916 births
1995 deaths
Canadian ice hockey defencemen
Ice hockey people from Manitoba
Montreal Canadiens players
People from Minnedosa, Manitoba
Toledo Mercurys players